is a major highway on the island of Honshū in Japan. It originates in Chiyoda, Tokyo and terminates in Numazu, Shizuoka. In and near Tokyo, it parallels the routes of the Dai-ichi Keihin, Dai-ni Keihin, and Tōmei Expressways, the Tōkyū Den-en-toshi Line, Odakyu Odawara Line, Gotemba Line, and other transportation systems.

In Shizuoka Prefecture, it passes through Susono, Oyama, and Nagaizumi en route to its terminus in Numazu.

Part of the route – running through Shibuya and past the outer gardens of the Meiji Jingu – was recreated in Gran Turismo 3: A-Spec under the name Tokyo Route 246. The same track is also featured in subsequent games in the series up until Gran Turismo 6. The Nogizaka46 song "Route 246" is named after the route.

References

Super-Mapple 2006 Edition

246
Roads in Kanagawa Prefecture
Roads in Shizuoka Prefecture
Roads in Tokyo